Jorat-Mézières is a municipality in the district of Lavaux-Oron in the canton of Vaud in Switzerland. On 1 July 2016 the former municipalities of Mézières (VD), Ferlens (VD) and Carrouge (VD) merged to form the new municipality of Jorat-Mézières.

Geography

Demographics

Historic Population
The historical population is given in the following chart:

Heritage sites of national significance

The Théâtre Du Jorat is listed as a Swiss heritage site of national significance.

References

Municipalities of the canton of Vaud